The 1952 United States presidential election in New York took place on November 4, 1952. All contemporary 48 states were part of the 1952 United States presidential election. Voters chose 45 electors to the Electoral College, which selected the president and vice president.

New York was won by former Supreme Allied Commander and World War II hero, Republican Dwight D. Eisenhower, who was running against Democratic Governor of Illinois Adlai Stevenson. Eisenhower ran with California Senator Richard Nixon as Vice President, and Stevenson ran with Alabama Senator John Sparkman. 

Eisenhower carried New York with 55.45% of the vote to Stevenson's 43.55%, a victory margin of 11.90%. 

New York weighed in for this election as 1% more Republican than the national average. 

The presidential election of 1952 was a very partisan election for New York, with 99% of the electorate casting votes for either the Republican Party or the Democratic Party. Eisenhower proved to be very popular in many of the Northern and Mid-West States, and took nearly every county in the State of New York, with the exception of a handful of counties conglomerate with New York City. The only counties in the state to vote for Stevenson were the New York City boroughs of Manhattan, Brooklyn and the Bronx, allowing Stevenson to win New York City overall.    

Eisenhower ultimately won election to the White House in 1952 as a war hero, a political outsider, and a moderate Republican who pledged to protect and support popular New Deal Democratic policies, ending twenty years of Democratic control of the White House. 

Eisenhower won the election in New York (his home state in the election) by a decisive 12 point margin. National turnout for the presidential election of 1952 is evident of the contemporary, lingering Democratic stronghold in the Deep South, which was the only region to vote primarily for Stevenson. Eisenhower was the first presidential candidate in United States history (and largely, globally as well) who targeted a large portion of his campaign to women voters. Dwindling popularity for the administration of Truman during the months following the conflict in Korea, and coupled with the relatively progressive agenda and campaign strategy laid down by the Republican Party, contributed to Eisenhower's powerful rise across the country.

Results

Results by county

See also
 United States presidential elections in New York
 History of nuclear weapons
 "I Like Ike"
 Presidency of Dwight D. Eisenhower
 The Korean War
 The McCarthy Era
 Women's Suffrage

Notes

References

New York
1952
1952 New York (state) elections